Down on the Upside is the fifth studio album by the American rock band Soundgarden, released on May 21, 1996, through A&M Records. Following a worldwide tour in support of its previous album, Superunknown (1994), Soundgarden commenced work on a new album. Self-produced by the band, the music on the album was notably less heavy and dark than the group's preceding albums and featured the band experimenting with new sounds.

The album topped the New Zealand and Australian charts and debuted at number two on the United States' Billboard 200, selling 200,000 copies in its opening week and spawning the singles "Pretty Noose", "Burden in My Hand", "Blow Up the Outside World", and "Ty Cobb". The band took a slot on the 1996 Lollapalooza tour and, afterward, supported the album with a worldwide tour.

Down on the Upside was Soundgarden's last studio album until 2012's King Animal, as tensions within the band led to its break-up in April 1997. The album has sold 1.6 million copies in the United States.

Recording
Recording sessions for the album took place between November 1995 and February 1996 at Studio Litho and Bad Animals Studios in Seattle, Washington. Studio Litho is owned by Pearl Jam guitarist Stone Gossard. The members of Soundgarden produced the album themselves. On the choice of not working with a producer, frontman Chris Cornell said that "a fifth guy is too many cooks and convolutes everything. It has to go down too many mental roads, which dilutes it." Drummer Matt Cameron added that, while working with Michael Beinhorn on Superunknown had good results, it was "a little more of a struggle than it needed to be", and self-production would make the process go faster. Adam Kasper, who previously had worked with Soundgarden as an assistant engineer on Superunknown, worked with the band as a production collaborator and mixed the album.

Work on the album began in July 1995. The band took a break to perform at festivals in Europe, where new material was road-tested. Afterward, the band did more songwriting for about a month and then recorded most of the album at Studio Litho. The overall approach to songwriting was less collaborative than with past efforts, with the individual band members having brought in most of the songs more completely written. The band sought to try things it had not done before and to use a greater variety of material. They tried to create a live atmosphere for the album, and looked to leave in sounds that producers would normally try to clean up, such as feedback and out-of-tune guitar parts. The overall time spent working on the album was less than what the band had spent working on Superunknown. Cornell described the album-making process as "way faster and way easier".

Most of the material was written by Cornell and bassist Ben Shepherd, the latter having already worked on six of the sixteen album tracks. Reportedly, tensions within the group arose during the recording sessions, with guitarist Kim Thayil and Cornell allegedly clashing over Cornell's desire to shift away from the heavy guitar riffing that had become the band's trademark. Thayil's only contribution to the album was the song "Never the Machine Forever", for which he wrote both the lyrics and the music, and which was also the last song the band recorded. The song initially came out of a jam session Thayil had with Seattle musician Greg Gilmore. In the liner notes, Thayil credits Gilmore for inspiring the song. He stated that he had a lot of incomplete music ideas that were missing lyrics and were not arranged, so they did not make the album. Thayil said: "It can be a little bit discouraging if there isn't satisfactory creative input, but on the other hand, I write all the solo bits and don't really have limitations on the parts I come up with for guitar." Cornell said: "By the time we were finished, it felt like it had been kind of hard, like it was a long, hard haul. But there was stuff we were discovering."

Music and lyrics

The album's songs placed emphasis on vocals and melody over the heavy guitar riffs that were found on the band's earlier LPs. It also features a rawer sound than Soundgarden's previous album Superunknown, as the band members produced the record themselves. Cornell summed up the changes by saying: "What we've lost in sonic precision we've gained so much in terms of feeling." Stephen Thomas Erlewine of AllMusic said Soundgarden "retained their ambitious song structures, neo-psychedelic guitar textures, and winding melodies but haven't dressed them up with detailed production." The songs vary in tempo throughout the course of the album, with Thayil describing the album as having a "dual nature". He stated, "It keeps listeners on their toes and lets them know they're not getting the same album over and over." Shepherd called the album "the most accurate picture of what Soundgarden actually sounds like", stating: "It's way more raw. It's way more honest. It's way more 'responsible.'"

The band stated at the time that it wanted to experiment with other sounds, which included Shepherd and Cornell playing mandolin and mandola in the song "Ty Cobb". This experimentation can be heard to a lesser degree on Superunknown. Soundgarden used alternative tunings and odd time signatures on several of the album's songs. For example, "Never the Machine Forever" uses a time signature of 9/8. "Pretty Noose" and "Burden in My Hand" were written in C-G-C-G-G-E tuning.

The overall mood of the album's lyrics is not as dark as on previous Soundgarden albums. Cornell even admitted "Dusty" was "pretty positive for a Soundgarden song", describing it as an opposite to the previous album's "Fell On Black Days". According to Cornell, "Pretty Noose" is about "an attractively packaged bad idea", and "Ty Cobb" is about a "hardcore pissed-off idiot". Cornell said the songs "Never Named" and "Boot Camp" are based on his childhood. Thayil said the lyrics for "Never the Machine Forever" are about "a life-and-death match between an individual and a less specifically defined entity". Cornell referred to "Overfloater" as "self-affirming".

Packaging
The album's cover art, photographed by Kevin Westenberg, features the members of the band in silhouette. Reportedly, at one point the photo of caterpillars eating a tomato that was used for the "Blow Up the Outside World" single was considered for use as the cover of Down on the Upside. The album was also released in a limited edition with the Into the Upside interview disc.

The title Down on the Upside comes from a line in the song "Dusty". The lyric is "I think it's turning back on me/I'm down on the upside". Cornell said the title represents the different feels on the album. In an interview, he explained how the name was chosen:
"I brought it up at some point because the song that the title came from was 'Dusty', but my title for it was 'Down on the Upside', but Ben wrote the music and he called it 'Dusty'. So since we don't really like having song titles being the title of the record, 'cause it brings this weird, undue focus to the song, I thought it would be cool to call it Down on the Upside. We started thinking about all these other titles, and worrying about them describing the whole record without excluding anything ... So it was the last minute and we were at a photo shoot for Spin and someone called and said, 'We need your title now so we can start doing the record package,' so Matt [Cameron] brought up the title again, and everyone went, 'yeah, that's it.'"
In an interview given by the band, Cameron and Shepherd jokingly said that two other titles considered for the album were Mr. Bunchy Pants and Comin' At Ya!

Release and reception

Down on the Upside had a 10,000-copy limited edition vinyl release on May 14, 1996, one week prior to its main release on CD and cassette. It debuted at number two on the Billboard 200 album chart with 175,500 units sold, behind only The Score by the Fugees. The album has gone on to sell 1.6 million copies in the United States, and has been certified Platinum by the RIAA.

Ivan Kreilkamp of Spin gave the album an eight out of ten, saying the album is "as sprawling and generous-spirited as Superunknown, but ... is a looser and live-er-sounding affair, not seeking the same level of aural precision". Alternative Press gave the album a three out of five, saying Soundgarden are "now fully capable of penning some damned spiffy pop songs", and adding that "they sound more human here, like they're playing in your living room". Rolling Stone staff writer David Fricke gave Down on the Upside three out of five stars, observing that the album has "some quality frenzy", but criticizing it for "lack[ing] defining episodes of catharsis", and saying: "Soundgarden seem to be digging in their heels rather than kicking up dirt, relying too much on drone-y impressionism and clever (as opposed to cleaving) guitar motifs." Neil Strauss of The New York Times called the album the "rawer, looser follow-up to Superunknown", adding: "Generally, identifying with animals in song lyrics is a sign of low self-esteem, and Soundgarden is no exception. For all the virility and macho power that rock singers have tried to wring from the [snake], Soundgarden remains more interested in the fact that it is the only animal cursed to spend its days slithering on the ground."

David Browne of Entertainment Weekly gave the album a B+, saying: "Few bands since Led Zeppelin have so crisply mixed instruments both acoustic and electric." He praised several songs as being "as powerful as anything the band has done", but criticized the album's production, saying that, "like many self-produced efforts, it shows." He added: "With arrangements that crest and fall to the point where a road map would have helped, the overlong (16-song) album is often unwieldy and could have benefited from judicious trimming." AllMusic staff writer Stephen Thomas Erlewine gave the album three out of five stars, saying that "it might seem like nothing more than heavy metal, but a closer listen reveals that Soundgarden haven't tempered their ambitions at all." The reviewer for Melody Maker said that "their roots don't matter now. All I care for now is the immediacy of their pop moments." Critic Robert Christgau gave the album an honorable mention of one star, describing it as "brutal depression simplified" and highlighted by the songs "Ty Cobb" and "Applebite", while Jason Josephes from Pitchfork called it a "double shot of grunge, no foam but plenty of caffeine." A negative review came from Johnny Cigarettes of NME, who gave the album 3/10 and said: "Throughout this record the mood of dark, demon-wrestling introspection continually rings hollow ... the lack of gut-level resonance [Soundgarden] create reveals all this as mere dark stylistics, the modern equivalent of a scary monster on an Iron Maiden T-shirt."

The album included the singles "Pretty Noose", "Burden in My Hand", and "Blow Up the Outside World", all of which had accompanying music videos. All three singles placed on the Mainstream Rock and Modern Rock charts. The album's other commercially released single, "Ty Cobb", did not chart, however its acommpanying B-side, "Rhinosaur", also from the album, did chart. "Burden in My Hand" was the most successful song from Down on the Upside on the rock charts, spending a total of five weeks at number one on the Mainstream Rock charts and reaching number two on the Modern Rock charts. At the 1997 Grammy Awards, "Pretty Noose" received a nomination for Best Hard Rock Performance.

Tour
The band took a slot on the 1996 Lollapalooza tour with Metallica, who had insisted on Soundgarden's appearance on the tour. Thayil said the band wasn't interested in doing the tour until it became a "Metallica tour". During the Lollapalooza tour, the band members reportedly took separate flights and then met at the gigs.

After Lollapalooza, the band embarked on a worldwide tour, supported by Moby. Tensions continued to increase and, when asked if the band hated touring, Cornell said: "We really enjoy it to a point and then it gets tedious, because it becomes repetitious. You feel like fans have paid their money and they expect you to come out and play them your songs like the first time you ever played them. That's the point where we hate touring." The band was criticized for its lack of energy while performing. Cornell said that "after a number of years, you start to feel like you're acting. All those people who criticize us for not jumping around should shut the fuck up, and when they come to our shows they should jump around and entertain us for a while." Thayil had an issue with how the band's audience had changed, stating that "nowadays, you also have the kids and the housewives, the casual fans. With your casual fans, you say, 'Thanks for the money.' And they say, 'Thanks for the song.'" The band's concerts in December 1996 were postponed for a week due to Cornell's throat problems.

At the final stop of the tour, in Honolulu, Hawaii, on February 9, 1997, Shepherd threw his bass into the air in frustration after suffering equipment failure, and subsequently stormed off the stage. The band retreated, and Cornell returned alone to conclude the show with a solo encore. On April 9, 1997, the band announced its disbanding. Thayil said, "It was pretty obvious from everybody's general attitude over the course of the previous half year that there was some dissatisfaction." Cameron later said that Soundgarden was "eaten up by the business".

Track listing

Outtakes
Various versions of the "Burden in My Hand" single featured two B-sides from the Down on the Upside recording sessions that were not included on the album: "Karaoke" and "Bleed Together". "Bleed Together" was included on the band's 1997 greatest hits compilation, A-Sides, and was released as a promo CD single in 1997. Thayil said the song was not included on Down on the Upside because the band was not pleased with the mixing that was done on the song and the band already had enough songs for the album.

Another song that was written and recorded for the album is "Kristi", which Cameron has said is one of his favorite Soundgarden songs. "Kristi" was finally mixed in 2014 and included on the compilation Echo of Miles: Scattered Tracks Across the Path, along with both "Karaoke" and "Bleed Together".

Personnel

Soundgarden
 Chris Cornell – vocals, guitar; mandolin and mandola (track 5), Rhodes electric piano (track 14)
 Kim Thayil – lead guitar
 Ben Shepherd – bass guitar, backing vocals; mandolin, mandola and intro instrumentation (track 5)
 Matt Cameron – drums, percussion, backing vocals; Moog synthesizer (track 9)

Additional musicians
 Adam Kasper – piano (track 9), co-production, engineering, mixing

Artwork
 Ben Marra Studios – "cinema" photography
 Helix creative inc, Seattle – art direction and design
 Ben Shepherd – back CD photo
 Kevin Westenberg – photography

Production
 Matt Bayles, Sam Hofstedt – assistant engineering
 John Burton, Tom Smurdon – additional tracking assistance
 David Collins – mastering at A&M Mastering Studios, Hollywood, CA
 Gregg Keplinger – drum technician
 Darrell Peters – guitar technician
 Soundgarden – production, mixing

Management
Susan Silver Management – management

Charts

Weekly charts

Year-end charts

Singles

Certifications

References

1996 albums
A&M Records albums
Albums produced by Adam Kasper
Soundgarden albums
Albums produced by Chris Cornell
Albums produced by Matt Cameron